Carnival Vol. II: Memoirs of an Immigrant is the sixth studio album by Haitian rapper and former Fugees member Wyclef Jean, released in 2007 as the sequel to his first solo album, The Carnival. Speaking to noted urban writer Pete Lewis of the award-winning Blues & Soul in September 2007, Wyclef explained his thinking behind the album: "Titling it The Carnival 2 was down to The Carnival back in '97 being my first multi-cultural CD. It had rhythms from all over the world, and in that way this new record is the sequel. You know, there's a revolution of culture going on around the world today where the United Nations is everywhere! You go into a room, and everybody's from a different country. It's like we're ALL immigrants! Some of these people may be listening to bhangra, some to hip hop, some to rock... And, when you put that fusion together, it unites people through music."

Track listing

Charts

Weekly charts

Year-end charts

References

2007 albums
Albums produced by Akon
Albums produced by will.i.am
Albums produced by Wyclef Jean
Wyclef Jean albums
Sequel albums